Jesús Antonio Castellanos Garrido (born 24 October 1978) is a Spanish retired footballer who played as a central defender and manager.

Club career
Born in El Bonillo, Castile-La Mancha, Castellanos was a youth product of local Albacete Balompié. After featuring with the reserves and being loaned to lowly Motril CF in his beginnings as a senior, he made his professional debut on 22 August 1999, playing the last 12 minutes in a 3–1 home win over SD Eibar in the Segunda División.

In the following years, Castellanos competed in the Segunda División B and Tercera División, representing Real Balompédica Linense, Motril, Amurrio Club, Jerez CF, Lorca Deportiva (also appearing in the second level in the 2005–06 season), Real Jaén, UD Almansa and La Roda CF.

References

External links

1978 births
Living people
Spanish footballers
Footballers from Castilla–La Mancha
Association football defenders
Segunda División players
Segunda División B players
Tercera División players
Atlético Albacete players
Motril CF players
Albacete Balompié players
Real Balompédica Linense footballers
Lorca Deportiva CF footballers
Real Jaén footballers
La Roda CF players
Spanish football managers
Segunda División B managers
La Roda CF managers